The Strangelings resulted from the union of The Kennedys and Chris & Meredith Thompson.  They perform a mixture of Kennedys and Thompsons songs along with traditional music and covers. All the songs of each set are performed as a suite with no breaks. In contrast to the naturalistic style of the Kennedys and the Thompsons, the Strangelings affect a stage persona. They have performed in New England, and also appeared at the 2007 Falcon Ridge Folk Festival. At the festival, 18-year-old fiddler Eric Lee sat in with the band at two campsite performances, then two days later debuted as the band's newest member headlining the main stage. 

Meredith Thompson decided to take time off from performing after the birth of her second son. Rebecca Hall & Ken Anderson joined the Strangelings in April 2007. The Kennedys recorded and produced an album to be released at Falcon Ridge Folk Festival in July 2007. The album features the Strangelings current lineup: Pete, Maura, Chris, Rebecca, and Ken. Fiddler Lee is not on the album.

The idea of the group is to be a folk jam band. They plan to have other artists sit in with them. In fact they contemplated calling themselves "The Changelings" to acknowledge the flexible lineup. Maura Kennedy indicated that the idea for the band began from conversations with Dave Carter, who had wanted to start a folk band. In tribute to Dave, the Strangelings perform several of Dave's songs, including "Tanglewood Tree" and "Mountain."

Most of their songs are ethereal with Maura, Chris and Rebecca creating complex angelic harmonies. Pete Kennedy plays lead guitar and electric sitar, Ken Anderson plays bass and Cheryl Prashker will sit in on drum kit for larger shows.

Discography
 Season of the Witch (2007) CD
 The Nuah Suite (2007) DVD

External links
 Chris & Meredith Thompson

Musical groups from Boston
Musical groups from Vermont
American folk musical groups